Vihar dam, is an earthfill dam on Vihar river in Mumbai, near Bhandup in the state of Maharashtra in India.

Specifications

Purpose
 Drinking water
 Water Supply
 hydroelectric power

See also
 Dams in Maharashtra
 List of reservoirs and dams in India

References

Dams in Mumbai
Dams completed in 1860
1860 establishments in India